Louis Joseph Troost (17 October 1825, Paris – 30 September 1911) was a French chemist.

Biography 
In 1848 he began his studies at the École Normale Supérieure in Paris, where from 1851 he worked as an assistant chemist. In 1856 he received his doctorate of sciences. After serving as chair of chemistry at the Lycée Bonaparte, he became a lecturer at the École Normale Supérieure (from 1868). Beginning in 1874, he was a professor of chemistry to the faculty of sciences in Paris, and in 1884, replaced Charles Adolphe Wurtz as a member of the Académie des sciences.

With Henri Sainte-Claire Deville, he worked on determining vapor densities at high temperatures and conducted studies on the porosity of metals at high temperatures. Also with Deville, he helped advance the concept of "chemical dissociation". In addition, he performed significant studies of lithium salts, and with Paul Hautefeuille, he conducted research on the solubility of gases in metals.

Selected works 
Troost was the author of Traité élémentaire de chimie (1847; 24th edition, 1948) that became a standard textbook for successive generations of students. His other noted works are:
 Recherches sur le lithium et ses composés, 1857.
 Precis de chimie, third edition, 1870.

References

1825 births
1911 deaths
Members of the French Academy of Sciences
Academic staff of the University of Paris
19th-century French chemists
Scientists from Paris